Kyle Kragen (born February 1, 1993) is an American football outside linebacker who is currently a free agent. He played college football for the University of California, Berkeley. He is the son of former American Football player Greg Kragen.

Professional career

Denver Broncos
Kragen signed with the Denver Broncos after going undrafted in the 2016 NFL Draft. On September 3, 2016, Kragen was waived by the Broncos. The next day he was signed to the Broncos' practice squad. On September 13, 2016, he was released from the Broncos' practice squad.

Carolina Panthers
On May 6, 2017, Kragen signed with the Carolina Panthers. He was waived on May 18, 2017.

References

External links
California Golden Bears bio

Further reading 

 Kyle Kragen follows in his father's steps Fort Collins Coloradoan
 Golden Beans' Kragen has NFL lineage, Sacramento Bee

1993 births
Living people
American football linebackers
California Golden Bears football players
Denver Broncos players
Carolina Panthers players